Manuel Rigal (1901 – death unknown) was a Cuban shortstop in the Negro leagues and Cuban League between 1922 and 1927. 

A native of Havana, Cuba, Rigal made his Negro league debut in 1922 with the Cuban Stars (West). He played for the Stars again in 1923 and 1927. Rigal also played in the Cuban League for Marianao and the Leopardos de Santa Clara.

References

External links
 and Baseball-Reference Black Baseball stats and Seamheads

1901 births
Date of birth missing
Year of death missing
Place of death missing
Cuban Stars (West) players
Leopardos de Santa Clara players
Marianao players
Baseball infielders
Cuban expatriate baseball players in the United States